Greatest Hits is the first compilation album released by American singer Melissa Manchester. It was issued by Arista Records in 1983, shortly after the release of Manchester's biggest hit, the new wave top 10 hit "You Should Hear How She Talks About You".

The compilation spans 10 songs, which cover the years 1975 to 1983, starting with Manchester's first Arista single (and first top 10 hit) "Midnight Blue", from her third album Melissa up to two new songs recorded specifically for this record: "Nice Girls" and a medley of two 60's covers: "My Boyfriend's Back" and "Runaway", both produced by Arif Mardin, who had produced Manchester's previous record Hey Ricky.

While the compilation includes her three Billboard top 10 singles, "Midnight Blue", "Don't Cry Out Loud" and "You Should Hear How She Talks About You", it is fairly incomplete, as it only includes three more songs that became hits for her in the USA, including the Academy Award-nominated 1979 song "Through the Eyes of Love", from the soundtrack of the film Ice Castles, which had not been included on any of Manchester's albums up to that point.

No material from Manchester's Arista albums Help Is On The Way (1976), Singin''' (1977) and For The Working Girl (1980) is included, while her 1979 self-titled album is only represented by the song "Whenever I Call You Friend", a song Manchester co-wrote with Kenny Loggins and became a top 10 hit for him and Stevie Nicks in 1978 (Manchester duets with Arnold McCuller on her version, which was not released as a single). In addition, "Come In From The Rain", a song which Manchester wrote and first recorded in 1976 as an album track but became a hit for Captain & Tennille a year later, is also included, albeit in its 1982 remixed version found on Manchester's album Hey Ricky.

"Nice Girls" and "My Boyfriend's Back" were released as singles, with the former peaking at #42 in the Billboard Hot 100. Both became top 40 hits on the Adult Contemporary chart. The compilation peaked at #43 in the USA, and was a steady seller, eventually being certified gold in 1989 by the RIAA.

A German 1994 reissue added 6 bonus tracks, all of which were released as singles and charted on the Billboard Hot 100, including the 1983 single "No One Can Love You More Than Me", which was released later in the year from Manchester's last Arista album Emergency''.

Track listing

Charts

References

1983 greatest hits albums
Arista Records compilation albums
Melissa Manchester albums